The 1876 North Shropshire by-election was fought on 3 February 1876.  The by-election was fought due to the elevation to the peerage of the incumbent Conservative MP, John Ormsby-Gore.  It was won by the Conservative candidate Stanley Leighton.

References

1876 elections in the United Kingdom
1876 in England
19th century in Shropshire
By-elections to the Parliament of the United Kingdom in Shropshire constituencies